This is a list of the top 33 sovereign states of the world sorted by their foreign exchange reserves excluding gold reserves, but including special drawing rights (SDRs) and International Monetary Fund (IMF) reserve positions.

The table includes the latest available data as on of 4 December, mostly from the IMF, and includes certain economies that are not considered to be sovereign states (such as Hong Kong, Macau and the Eurozone, because of their special economic statuses).

List

See also
 List of countries by foreign-exchange reserves
 List of circulating currencies

Notes

References

foreign-exchange reserves (excluding gold), List Of Countries By
Foreign exchange reserves